is a Japanese anime television series based on Tsunoda Jiro's original manga titled Gakuen Seven Wonders. The series was directed by Shin Misawa and produced by Studio Comet and 41 episodes were broadcast on Fuji TV from April 12, 1991, to March 13, 1992.

Plot
Mizuki Ichijo is a junior student at Kosen High School. Her grandmother was a medium and she experiences various psychic and mysterious phenomena which occur at the school: accidents, suicides, bullying, resentment, romance and more. She is befriended by the third year student Meiko Tsukikage, and together they attempt to solve the mysteries.

Voice cast

External links 
 

1991 anime television series debuts